The southwestern crevice-skink (Egernia napoleonis) is a species of large skink, a lizard in the family Scincidae. The species is native to western Australia.

References

Skinks of Australia
Egernia
Reptiles described in 1838
Taxa named by John Edward Gray